Arif Ariyanto (born June 17, 1985) is an Indonesian footballer that last played for Persela Lamongan in the Indonesia Super League.

Honours

Club honors
Persebaya Surabaya
First Division (1): 2006

References

External links

1985 births
Living people
People from Sidoarjo Regency
Sportspeople from East Java
Javanese people
Indonesian footballers
Association football midfielders
Liga 1 (Indonesia) players
Indonesian Premier League players
Arema F.C. players
Persebaya Surabaya players
Persela Lamongan players